Alba Berlin is a German professional basketball club that is based in Berlin, Germany. The club was founded in 1991, and is today the largest German national basketball club by membership figures. Alba Berlin hosts its home games at the Mercedes-Benz Arena Berlin and competes in the German League and the EuroLeague or the EuroCup.

After winning ten German Championships, ten German Cups, three German Supercups, and the FIBA Korać Cup in 1995, Alba Berlin is considered to be the most successful German basketball team, both domestically and internationally. With an average attendance of more than 10,000 fans per game in a season, it is also one of the most popular basketball clubs in Europe. In 2013, Alba was portrayed in the ESPN documentary series Basketball Capitals.  In 2014, the club was the first German basketball team to beat a reigning NBA champion, the San Antonio Spurs.

History

1991–2000: Foundation and first championships
Alba Berlin traces its history back to the BG Charlottenburg, a basketball club in western Berlin which was founded in 1989. In 1991, when the global recycling company ALBA Europe agreed to a significant basketball sponsorship, BG Charlottenburg changed its name to Alba Berlin.

Shortly thereafter, under the direction of head coach Faruk Kulenović, Alba Berlin became runner-up at the German Championship. In 1993, the Serbian Svetislav Pešić took over as coach, and the club gained successes that no other German basketball team had previously accomplished. Winning the Korać Cup in 1995 marked the first international title of a German club team in basketball.

In 1996, shortly after moving the club from the Sömmeringhalle to the Max-Schmeling-Halle, Alba Berlin finally beat series champion Bayer Leverkusen and won its long-awaited first German Championship. In addition to winning the Korać Cup and other successes at the European level, in his seven-year career as head coach, Pešić won four German championships and one German Cup.

2000–2008: Professionalization and national success

Under head coach Emir Mutapčić, the team recorded three German championships and two German Cup victories, but particularly at the European level no significant progress could be made. As a reaction to the time without titles, the team was largely rebuilt for each new season. In 2004 and 2005, Berlin eventually was kicked out of the national playoffs semi-final series. Organizationally, the club created the new position of team manager, which was occupied by Henning Harnisch. Further, the professional section of the club was transformed into a GmbH on 1 September 2005.

In the season 2005–06, under new coach Henrik Rödl, Alba Berlin won another German Cup. As winner of the regular season, the team advanced to the finals series of the championship, in which they lost to RheinEnergie Köln. Köln was coached by Saša Obradović, who had helped Berlin win the FIBA Korać Cup in 1995. The following season, 2006–07, however, Berlin was once again winner of the regular season but was eliminated in the quarter finals by the Artland Dragons. This event triggered the dismissal of Rödl and the signing of a new head coach Luka Pavićević, followed by another major remodeling of the team. After injury problems in the preparation and the course of the 2007–08 season, including the loss of Goran Jeretin for the entire season and Aleksandar Rašić for the play-offs, Berlin took advantage of the insolvency of the Cologne 99ers and signed their major players Immanuel McElroy and Aleksandar Nađfeji in January 2008. Led by the league MVP Julius Jenkins, the team was superior to all other competitors in the play-offs and won the championship again after a five-year hiatus.

In the 2003–04 season, Berlin achieved its last master qualification to participate in the highest European League, the EuroLeague. Between the 2004–05 and 2007–08 seasons, the team was only able to qualify for the ULEB Cup, the second-highest European league. There, the team only made it beyond the first round in the 2006–07 season, when they were eliminated in the second round.

2008–present: Current era

With the move into the new 14,500-seat O2 World Berlin, the then-reigning champion Alba Berlin opened a new chapter in the club's history. Berlin was the first team in German history to ever average more than 7,000 fans in attendance per game. Thus, Alba's manager Marco Baldi and Supervisory Board chairman, Axel Schweitzer, decided to take the next step towards a permanent presence in international competition and appropriate presentation options. The Anschutz Group, owner of the O2 World Berlin, and Alba Berlin agreed to a 15-year contract until 2023, with an option for another ten years.

As the reigning German champion, Alba participated in the 2008–09 Euroleague. There, the team reached the Top 16, where it could not hold its ground against European elite clubs like FC Barcelona, Real Madrid, and Maccabi Tel Aviv. Yet, Alba had Europe's highest attendance at 11,264 spectators in the O2 World Berlin. In addition, the club gathered 14,800 spectators in the main round home game against Union Olimpija, a record crowd at a European Cup game in Germany. While at the national level in the cup final, Alba defeated Baskets Bonn. Later, Alba was beaten by the same team in the play-off semi-final series in five games.

In 2009 and 2015, the manager of Alba Berlin, Marco Baldi, was honored by Euroleague Basketball Company executives with the EuroLeague Executive of the Year Award.

On 8 October 2014 Alba Berlin defeated the defending NBA champion San Antonio Spurs, 94–93, on a buzzer beater by Jamel McLean.

In the 2014–15 season, Alba returned to the EuroLeague and reached the Top 16. In the Bundesliga, the team had another disappointing season: the team finished in second place but was eliminated in the semifinals. In the 2015–16 season, Alba had one of its worst seasons in history as the team managed to finish only in 7th place in the regular season, though Alba managed to win the German Cup. In the playoffs, the team was eliminated in the quarterfinals. In the 2016–2017 season, the same thing repeated – a disappointing sixth-place finish in the Bundesliga. 

The 2017–2018 season, though Alba returned to the finals, losing only to Bayern Munich. Alba also had one of the better Eurocup campaigns of the past years, being closest to the playoffs in years. Alba had brought an awarded veteran for the 2017/18: The Spaniard Aíto García Reneses, 70 years old at the time of signing up his first contract abroad. He had won nine Spanish championship titles (Spanish Basketball Liga) as well as Olympic silver as a coach (2008). With him a successful Spanish Army took over: The 2017 new coaching staff also included other Spaniards: such as co-coach Israel González who had worked with Aito in the past, individual coach Carlos Frade and athletics coach Pepe Silva Moreno. As in the previous course of his coaching work, García Reneses has increasingly brought players from the younger teams into the professional team in Berlin, like Franz Wagner, Jonas Mattisseck and Tim Schneider [26] .

In the 2018–2019 season, Alba had some of its greatest success in more than a decade, as they not only played in the Bundesliga finals for the second year in a row, but also managed to reach the 2019 EuroCup Finals, where they ultimately lost the series 1–2 to Valencia Basket. Two of Alba's players, Rokas Giedraitis, and Luke Sikma (who was also named the league's MVP), were selected to the All-EuroCup First Team, while the team's coach, Aíto García Reneses, was named the Eurocup Coach of the Year. The club also set the season's record for highest attendance, with 12,945 spectators in a finals game against Valencia Basket, which Alba won 95–92.

The 2019–20 season was altered due to the COVID-19 pandemic. In a final tournament behind closed doors in Munich, Alba went on an undefeated 10–0 streak to win its 9th German title, its first in twelve years. In the 2021–22 season, Alba won the BBL again.

Players

Retired numbers

Current roster

Depth chart

Squad changes for the 2022–2023 season

In

Out

Season by season

Honours

Total Titles: 26

Domestic competitions
 German League (11)
 Winners: 1996–97, 1997–98, 1998–99, 1999–00, 2000–01, 2001–02, 2002–03, 2007–08, 2019–20, 2020–21, 2021–22
 German Cup (11)
 Winners: 1996–97, 1998–99, 2001–02, 2002–03, 2005–06, 2008–09, 2012–13, 2013–14, 2015–16, 2019–20, 2021–22
 German Supercup (3)
 Winners: 2008, 2013, 2014

European competitions
 FIBA Korać Cup (1)
 Winners: 1994–95
 EuroCup
 Runners-up: 2009–10, 2018–19

Other competitions
 Zadar Basketball Tournament
 Runners-up: 2019
 Berlin, Germany Invitational Game
 Winners: 2010
 Zielona Gora, Poland Invitational Game
 Winners: 2015
 Torneo EncestaRias
 Winners: 2018
 Trofeo Alava
 Runners-up: 2018
 Clermont-Ferrand, France Invitational Game
 Winners: 2019
 Oranienburg, Germany Invitational Game
 Winners: 2019

Games against NBA teams

The road to 1995 FIBA Korać Cup victory

Hall of Fame

Notable players

Head coaches
  Svetislav Pešić: (1993–2000)
  Emir Mutapčić: (2000–2005)
  Henrik Rödl: (2005–2007)
  Luka Pavićević: (2007–2011)
  Muli Katzurin: (2011)
  Gordon Herbert: (2011–2012)
  Saša Obradović: (2012–2016)
  Ahmet Çakı: (2016–2017)
  Aíto García Reneses: (2017–2021)
  Israel González: (2021–present)

Home arenas

Sömmeringhalle: (1991–1996)
Deutschlandhalle: (1995), used only once, for the FIBA Korać Cup Final
Max-Schmeling-Halle: (1996–2008)
Mercedes-Benz Arena: (2008–present)

Sponsorships

See also
2012 NBA Europe Live Tour

References

External links

 
Euroleague.net Team Profile
Eurobasket.com Team Profile

 
Basketball teams established in 1991
Basketball clubs in Berlin
Sport in Berlin
EuroLeague clubs
1991 establishments in Germany